South Texada Island Provincial Park is a provincial park in British Columbia, Canada, located on the southwest side of Texada Island.  Created in 1997, the park is approximately 900 ha. in area.

References

Provincial parks of British Columbia
Texada Island
Protected areas established in 1997
1997 establishments in British Columbia